Shane Suska (born 23 May 1973 in Maitland, New South Wales) is an Australian sprint canoeist who competed in the early 2000s. At the 2000 Summer Olympics in Sydney, he was eliminated in the semifinals of the K-4 1000 m event.

References

External links 
 Sports-Reference.com profile

1973 births
Australian male canoeists
Canoeists at the 2000 Summer Olympics
Living people
Olympic canoeists of Australia
People from Maitland, New South Wales
Sportsmen from New South Wales